The Nigeria National Baseball Team is the national baseball team of Nigeria. The team represents Nigeria in international competitions and is ranked 6th in Africa (2020 ranking release), down from 2nd in Africa. And ranking number 70 in the world standing (2020 ranking release)

Tournament record

All-Africa Games

In 1999 Nigeria won the silver medal by defeating every other national team except South Africa, to whom they lost in the final.  In order, Nigeria won against Lesotho (14–3), Zimbabwe (12–11), Uganda (27–1) and Ghana (14–5) until a blowout loss to South Africa (1–19) in the championship game. Nigeria was again a dominant power in the 2003 Games held in Abuja, cruising to the final where they lost to South Africa 0–15 to earn the silver medal again. Baseball was scheduled to make a return to the All-Africa Games in Mozambique in 2011, but this did not occur as planned.

Players
 Victor Achakpo
 Adedeji Adekunli
 Adeyinaka Adewusi
 Akeem Adeyemi
 Godwin Agobie
 Toba Elegbi
 Olakunle Aina
 Olawale Jimi Kolawole
 Emmanuel Motoni
 Ceaser Ofoedu
 Michael Oguwuche
 Michael Okoli
 Wande Olabisi
 Emmanuel Oladinni
 Godfrey Nwanekah
 Gbenga Olayemi
 Joseph Olayemi
 Victor Owoyokun
 Sunday Twaki

Uniforms

References

National baseball teams in Africa
baseball